National Highway 321, commonly referred to as NH 321 is a national highway in India. It is a spur road of National Highway 21.  NH-321 runs in the state of Uttar Pradesh in India.

Route 
NH321 connects Kiraoli, Mori, Vamanpura, Jaingara and Kagarol in the state of Uttar Pradesh.

Junctions  
 
  Terminal near Kiraoli.

See also 
 List of National Highways in India
 List of National Highways in India by state

References

External links 

 NH 321 on OpenStreetMap

National highways in India
National Highways in Uttar Pradesh